Pleasant Goat and Big Big Wolf is a Chinese animated anime-influenced television series created by animation director Huang Weiming and produced by Creative Power Entertaining. The show is about a group of goats living on the Green Green Grassland and a clumsy wolf who wants to eat them.

The cartoon became enormously popular with Chinese schoolchildren after its debut in 2005. Cashing in on the cartoon's success, the producer made an animated feature film in 2009. It generated a box office revenue of 79 million yuan (approx. US $11.5 million) during Chinese New Year that year. It is aired on over 40 local TV stations, including Zhejiang Television, CCTV and Aniworld Satellite Television, Hong Kong's TVB and Taiwan's Momo Kids. The show was also aired in India, South Korea, Malaysia, Singapore, Indonesia, Cambodia and North America. As of 2011, an English dub has been aired in Taiwan. In 2010, Disney gained the license to broadcast the show on their Disney Channels. Alpha terminated the contract with Disney before the expiration date in September 2016 at the expense of US$2 million, thus Pleasant Goat and Big Big Wolf has had nothing to do with Disney since then.

Toon Express Group, a subsidiary of Alpha Animation and a Creative Power Entertaining's sister company, owns the copyrights to the characters.

History
Pleasant Goat and Big Big Wolf had 510 episodes when it premiered (2005~2007). After it became moderately successful, Creative Power Entertaining created more than 2,000 episodes, including 60 exclusive Olympics episodes in 2008 an addition of 20 more episodes to the first season in 2009.

In January 2009, its first movie Pleasant Goat and Big Big Wolf - The Super Adventure was launched in China. It has broken the domestic box office record for a Chinese animated film, collecting 30 million yuan (US$4.39 million) during its opening weekend. On the first day of release alone, the movie made 8 million Yuan. According to Beijing News, the weekend's revenue was well ahead of the previous record holder for domestic animation, Storm Rider Clash of the Evils – the adaptation of the Storm Riders comic brought in 25 million Yuan in two weeks when it was released the previous summer.

Describing the Pleasant Goat movie as a "dark horse", Zhao Jun, general manager of China Film South Cinema Circuit Co. Ltd., predicted the film would make at least 60 million yuan in total box office revenue.  A manager of the Beijing-based Stellar International Cineplex said the movie theatre's biggest hall, which had been scheduled to screen Red Cliff II, was reassigned to show Pleasant Goat and Big Big Wolf: The Super Adventure in order to meet popular demand.

China's Xinhua news agency quoted unspecified "insiders" as crediting the cartoon's success to the large pool of fans who have tuned into the Pleasant Goat and Big Big Wolf television cartoon series over the past three years.  Based on the 530-episode television series, The Super Adventure stars the same characters but in a very different scenario. The movie's storyline tells how several goats and their old nemesis, Wolffy, join forces to defeat their common archenemy – bacteria.

A second movie, Desert Trek: The Adventure of the Lost Totem, was also released. The movie contains many original songs. Yang Peiyi, who performed Ode to the Motherland at 2008 Summer Olympics Opening Ceremony, was invited to sing "Left hands and Right hands".

In 2010, Creative Power Entertaining Corporation (CPE) said that it had reached a television license broadcast agreement with Disney affiliate Buena Vista to air its products. With this deal the popular Chinese cartoon show for children will be aired on Disney channels in 52 countries and regions and in more than 10 different languages. A milestone for China's homegrown animation industry.

The third movie, Moon Castle: The Space Adventure was launched in 2011. The fourth movie Mission Incredible: Adventures on the Dragon's Trail followed in 2012. The theme and name of all four movies is the animal of the Chinese zodiac of the year in which it was released. The second, third, and fourth movies were all released at Chinese New Year. The fourth film reached the highest boxoffice of the film series, 167.619 million yuan.

The fifth film is The Mythical Ark: Adventures in Love & Happiness, the sixth film is Meet the Pegasus and the seventh film is Amazing Pleasant Goat released on January 31, 2015. These films' boxoffice goes down one by one, with Amazing Pleasant Goat only 67.815 million yuan, so CPE decided to slow down making the film. The ninth film is Pleasant Goat and Big Big Wolf 3D Movie, which decided to release in 2023.

Two live-action animated films of the series titled I Love Wolffy and I Love Wolffy 2 respectively were also released but neither reached a boxoffice of 80 million yuan, so the third live-action animated film will not be made.

The investment banker Francis Leung, who planned to buy Toon Express Group, had plans to make Pleasant Goat a very popular and visible television show that would, as stated by The Wall Street Journal, "parallel the popularity of Mickey Mouse and Hello Kitty".

Premise
In year 3010 on the fictional Goat Calendar, the ancestor of the goat clan, Ruan Mianmian (or Old Mandy), arrives at Green Green Grassland to escape the wolves. The goats built a tall iron gate outside their village and called it 'Goat Village'. This leaves the wolves to try and break in any way they can. One day, a wolf suggests that they exercise, get thin and squeeze through the bars. So the wolf ancestor, Wu Dalang, manages to get through after long exercising, only to die after swallowing a huge rock covered in wool, mistaking it for a big sheep. After this incident, the wolves learned not to make the goats of Green Green Grassland angry, for there will be consequences.

503 years later in the year 3513, the descendant of Wu Dalang (Fitter), Wolffy moves to the opposite of the river separating the forest and the Goat Village with his wife Wolnie, due to low hunting ability demonstrated by Wolffy and the fact that he is no longer regarded a proper wolf. They move there in hope of finding a way to eat the goats, as tales told by ancestors say that the goats there are the best and tastiest. The goats live in the Green Green Grassland happily. The main characters are depicted as school-aged goats that attend school under the tutelage of Slowy, the village elder.

Wolffy and Wolnie live in a castle far from the village and are constantly trying to hunt the goats for food. But the goats in this time are intelligent and powered with technology. Every time Wolffy appears at the Goat Village, he concocts a plan to catch the goats. Among the goat students, a smart young male goat named Weslie always finds a way to ruin Wolffy's plans and save the goats. With the effort of Weslie and his friends, Wolffy never captures any goats. At the end of each episode, Wolffy always promises to come back, each time shouting his catchphrase: 'Darn goats! I will definitely come back again!'

The conflict between Wolffy and Weslie never ends, although Wolffy fails all the time, he never gives up. While he is mean to the goats, he is a nice and timid husband to Wolnie and a great dad to his son, Wilie. Wolnie is somewhat impatient and enjoys making her husband do all the work. She rarely tries to catch the goats herself (failing every time as well), but always yells at her husband. She likes fashion and behaves like a modern female adult (though sometimes her thoughts are a bit childish). She knows nothing but eating goats and she loves to hit Wolffy with her frying pan. Despite this fact, deep down Wolnie still loves her husband.

Weslie and his friends are portrayed as playful primary school kids, each of whom has his/her own unique characteristic. Tibbie is a fashionable young female goat who is always worrying about her looks and esteem. Sparky is a young male goat who likes to work out; he has a crush on Tibbie. Paddi is a cute male goat who likes to relax. Paddi is one of the most popular characters in the series. There are many other young, anonymous goats, as well as their teacher Slowy, an old goat referred to as the "Village Chief", who is a scientist and develops machines to protect their school. He is slower than a snail and uses a walking stick.

Characters

Goats
Happy or Weslie
Voiced by: 
Weslie is the main character of the series. He is a school-aged goat living in the Goat Village of Green Green Grassland. He wears a blue ribbon around his neck with a bell, which is a present from his parents. Weslie is an archetypal hero character; he is positive, intelligent and always supportive of his friends. He takes a leadership role in his class and among his peers and is Slowy's assistant. Weslie is observant and intelligent, and in general, is the often the first to detect danger and see through Wolffy's plots and traps. He also seems to be quite calm and forgiving, as he forgives Wolffy and his family at the end of the first movie for betraying them by sending them a trap-gift. He loves to play pranks and all his friends get mad at him. He also enjoys being treated with offers by Tibbie. He and Wolffy become friends in the "Mighty Little Defenders". 

Voiced by: Gao Quansheng
Slowy is an adult goat that serves as a village elder of sorts. His name is pun on "slow and steady", implying that while slow, he also harbors a steady wisdom. He functions as the only adult figure in the story, and not only serving as the head of the lamb village, but also as the schoolmaster. He often uses trickery to teach his students valuable lessons about life, and often sends them on assignments.
Outside of the school yard, he is shown as a goat of many pursuits, creating wacky inventions and performing questionable experiments with humorous results. In addition, when he thinks too hard, his head will begin to grow leaves.

His character design is somewhat based on Albert Einstein, with wild frizzy hair, a mustache, and a pair of spectacles.

Lazy, Lance or Paddi
Voiced by: Liang Ying
A small, gluttonous goat wearing a yellow drool bib. He hates working and likes to sleep, but due to his lazy nature he is often the first caught by Wolffy. Paddi is one of the most intelligent of all of the goats, although this is concealed by his laziness. He also has a habit of falling asleep whenever Wolffy kidnaps the goats. He is sometimes a bit selfish. He has been revealed to hold a varying number of hidden talents throughout the show, such as diving. Wolffy's son Wilie has an attachment to him, and will often address him as "Brother Paddi". He is also one of the most popular characters.

Mae, Beauty or Tibbie
Voiced by: Deng Yuting
A female goat in Green Green Grassland, who always wears pink bows on her horns and pink shoes and a pink scarf with a white line. She is one of Slowy's students. She likes applying make-up and cooking. She is generally liked by all the goats in Green Green Grassland. Tibbie is shown to be the most emotional goat such as crying, and her friends have to calm her down. Tibbie is shown to not really like caterpillars, roaches, or bugs crawling on her or seeing one, but she likes crafting flower wreaths, attracting other animals to her beauty. Tibbie is usually gentle, kind, and sweet to her friends, but is serious when she is angry, usually making Weslie or Sparky to calm her down. Her best friend is Jonie and likes to do various activities with her, such as dressing up in pretty clothes.

Fray, Fitty or Sparky
Voiced by: Liu Hongyun, 
 Sparky is the only dark-skinned goat. He is a school-aged goat that attends the same school as Weslie. Sparky is depicted as a jock character of sorts. He is the strongest of his group and enjoys sports and showing off his strength to others. He is quick-tempered and quick to act, often charging headlong into dangerous situations.  He likes to pick on Paddi, but occasionally still treats him as a friend. Sparky's best friend is Weslie and likes to help him get rid of Wolffy while he tries to attack the goats. 
 Despite his strength, he is still physically weaker than Wolffy.

Rany, Gentty or Jonie
Voiced by: Deng Yuting
 She is a docile and kind female goat who is class president of Weslie's class in school. She is revealed in the Olympics special to possess mountain goat genes, effectively making her the strongest goat in Goat Village above Sparky. She is the most sensible goat, but can sometimes be talkative. She is friends with Jay, and best friends with Tibbie, whom two like to do various activities together. Like Tibbie, Jonie is usually gentle and kind but she tends to scold the boy goats (Weslie, Sparky, and Paddi) but still hangs out and cares for them. She has a small pink heart-shaped satchel that she wears as well as a matching ribbon and red shoes. She has a pet owl which is purple called 'nuan-nuan', or warm-warm.

Stacy
 Voiced by: Yan Yanzi
 In one episode the goats brought Stacy to Goat Village through the time machine Slowy invented. She painted her horns pink and wears pretty pink petaled flowers (with yellow smiley faces in the middle) on them. She wears a purple purse and pink shoes and a pink choker. She has short ponytails with bells on them. When she was an adult, she had pretty bangs. Tibbie became slightly jealous of her because she was more beautiful when she was in Goat Village. She is gentle and sweet, with a soft voice and a beautiful tone. 
She is also mentioned by Slowy in the sixth movie.

Wolves
Wolffy
Voiced by: Zhang Lin
Wolffy is the main antagonist of the series.
Wolffy is the 250th generation grandson of Wu Dalang, the ancestor of the wolf clan. Wolffy is a middle-aged, hen-pecked husband, he wears an orange cap with a yellow patch and has a scar under his eye. Wolffy is very smart but conceited, he is a good cook and always makes delicious dishes for his family. He is the king of the wolves of the Green Green Grassland and he claims that he is the greatest inventor in the Green Green Grassland. He lives with his demanding wife, Wolnie, in a castle on the outskirts of Lamb village in Green Green Grassland. Wolffy is usually motivated solely by the fear of his wife. He is constantly under her demand to bring home goats for food.
A rather bumbling character, he always concocts elaborate plans and creates fanciful traps to catch the goats, with limited success. He usually ends up being outwitted by the goats, and is often unable to find loopholes in his overly complex plans. His failures to obtain food are met by angry scoldings from his wife and slapstick violence, such as being hit over the head with a frying pan. Even so, his love for Wolnie never wavered. Since he always unable to catch any goats, his wolf identity (wolf identity is just like a nationality, which provides social security and medical benefits) has been revoked many times by the wolf pack.

It is worth noting that Wolffy himself lacked any real desire to catch the lambs at first, and only did so in an attempt to appease and impress his wife. He will readily abandon his hunt should some other means appear that will likely impress his wife more.
His catchphrase (which he utters in one form or another each episode) is "Darn goat! I'll definitely come back/ I'll come back for sure/ I'll be back/ I'll get my revenge!" (mostly "I'll be back" in later seasons, which is based on The Terminator). He always catches frogs or makes salad for meals as he cannot catch any goats. He and Happy (Weslie) become friends in the "Mighty Little Defenders".
 
In China, sometimes he is seen as a respectable cartoon character/figure by older generations because of his faithfulness to his wife despite the fact that he fears her and also the fact that he has not given up yet on catching goats.

In one episode Wolffy invites his uncle to stay, but he fears losing face in front of him because of Wolnie's violence. He convinces his wife to pretend to be submissive while the uncle was there. However, at the end of the episode when the uncle leaves, Wolnie gives him a good thrashing "to compensate for all the time she missed out on hitting him".

Wolnie
Voiced by: Zhao Na
The narcissistic wife of Wolffy, who dresses in a red robe with black and white trims. With red lipsticks, with make-up, and has two hoops on her feet. She is over-demanding and abusive towards her husband, hitting him with her frying pan whenever his schemes fail. However, despite abusing him she still genuinely love him and deeply cares for his safety. Additionally, she's actually shown to be intelligent; while her husband can think of outlandish inventions to catch goats, her simple ideas are the ones that are actually successful.

Howie or Wilie
Voiced by: Liang Ying
He is the son of Wolffy and Wolnie.  He is a cute cub with two big eyes. He is approximately 2-6 years old in human years. He is a rather large crybaby, but is very innocent. He likes to go out hunting with his father but gets lost most of the time.  He plays a large role in the first movie, The Super Adventure, as well as in the second movie, Desert Trek: The Adventure of the Lost Totem, the third movie, Moon Castle: The Space Adventure, and the newly released fourth movie, Mission Incredible: Adventures on the Dragon's Trail.
He also forms a (mostly) one-sided friendship with Paddi, and affectionately calls him "Brother Paddi". Their relationship is highlighted in the second and fifth movie. He has an attachment on Paddi, but he likes the other goats, such as dressing Weslie as "Brother Weslie," and Tibbie as "Sister Tibbie", and so on. 
After he is expelled from the Wolf school, his father reluctantly enrolls him in the goat school, where he becomes friends with all the other goats, occasionally aiding them in their struggle against Wolffy.

Huang Tailang
Voiced by: Zhang Lin
Wolffy's Grandfather. Like his grandson, he is often abused by his wife (usually via getting things thrown at his head).

Hei Tailang
Wolffy's Father. He was the previous villain of Goat Village before the goats found a way to hex him with a cursed invention, resulting in his falling into a burning fire and meeting his end, but in rescue across time, his death was different.

Jay
Voiced by: Liu Hongyun
He is a large, mild-mannered wolf who is a vegetarian obsessed with bananas.  He befriends Jonie, who likes to provide him with bananas. He was forced to marry Fragrant Wolf but after he realizes Fragrant was a cruel as Wolnie when they were at the Central Carnival Park, he decided not to and fled from his wedding saying, "I DON'T!!!!!!!!!!!!!!!" (Even Wolffy warned him not to marry Fragrant because he got married the exact same way with his wife as Banana almost married Fragrant.) He is the nephew of Wolffy.

Xiang Tailang
Voiced by: Deng Yuting
Xiang Tailang is the cousin of Wolnie. She is a young female wolf with rainbow hoop earrings and a pink dress. She has a crush on Jay, and almost marries him, but ends up marrying Ye Tailang (Wolffy's cousin) at her wedding, who was secretly in love with her. Her name is probably a reference to Xiang Fei, a favored concubine of the Qianlong Emperor. Her weapon tends to be two irons, as shown in the episode the sisters receive a mysterious apple. She is very cruel, much like her cousin Wolnie.

Wu Dalang
The ancestor of the wolf clan and the archrival of Old Mandy, the ancestor of the goat clan. In episode 499, it was revealed that he was the one who gave Wolffy his scar during a time traveling shenanigan.

Others
 Crazy Brother or Jolly
Voiced by: Zu Liqing
Jolly is an egg with a face. He has a carefree and easygoing personality but is not always intelligent. An occult enthusiast and a joker, his catch phrase is "I'll put a curse on you!" while drawing circles into the ground with a stick. (Once, the drawn circle lit up and granted him powers to shoot laser beams out of his hands.) He enjoys teasing Paddi's pet by saying: "you unfinished egg!" Jolly also has many costumes that he changes into in special occasions. He and his brother can merge and become an ultimate powerful egg. (When this happens, the resulting combination looks like Jolly but with a red cape and a red underwear on his head.)
Black Commander, Darky or Darton
Voiced by: Gao Quansheng
Jolly's, black-egg younger brother. Has lightning powers and was evil for some time and was a team with Wolffy.
Noted that both, Darten and Jolly are their names from the lost Disney, Britanic English dub from Great War in the Bizarre World. A story arc consisting of 60 episodes, episodes 281 to 340 out of the 530 of the original donghua.
Big Humphrey
Voiced by: Gao Quansheng
An elephant that serves as the mayor and chief of justice of Green Green Grassland, which encompasses the Goat Village and the Wolf Castle as well as all the other places of residence in Green Green Grassland. His character is a parody of Bao Zheng, a Chinese figure revered for his fairness and judicial judgment in court.
Tiger
Voiced by: Gao Quansheng
A Tiger, so far the only tiger in the series, strong, well-muscled, loves to show off his muscles. His Chinese name is a play on the English word Tiger. It also sounds similar to the Chinese rendering of boxer Mike Tyson.
Flat-beak Allen
A rather narcissistic duck. He is a superstar singer and often holds concerts at the Green-Green Grassland. Wolffy is a great fan of his, in one episode dressing in drag to get his autograph. But this is often contradicted, such as in the episode where Wolffy kidnaps Allen, shaves him and uses his fur to dress up as him and gain access to the goats. His name is parody of Zhou Jielun (Jay Chou).

Pets
喜喜 (Xǐxǐ, "Happy" or "Joy")
Weslie's pet (a small little bouncing horse).
美美 (Měiměi, "Fuzzy" or "Tibtib")
Tibbie's pet (a tank and dog combined).
蛋蛋 (Dàndan, "Egg" or "Eggy")
Paddi's pet (a flat hard-boiled egg who can fit into small openings).
打打 (Dǎdǎ, "Hittie")
Sparky's pet (a pair of boxing gloves which is blue who actually wear "Fit").
暖暖 (Nuǎnnuǎn, "Warmy" or "Jojo")
Jonie's pet (a bird which is a color who can create a strong wind by flapping her wings).

Media

Animated series

Films
The series was made into eight animated films and two live-action animated films.

Stage shows
Pleasant Goat and Big Big Wolf: Memory Thief, 2009
Pleasant Goat and Big Big Wolf: Three Wishes, 2010
Pleasant Goat and Big Big Wolf: Wilie's Wish, 2012
Pleasant Goat and Big Big Wolf: A Wonderful Musical Journey, 2013
Pleasant Goat and Big Big Wolf: Dance Your Dream, 2016

Broadcast
As of 2011, according to investment banker Francis Leung, quoted in the Wall Street Journal, over 75 cable and satellite television stations in Mainland China broadcast Pleasant Goat and Big Big Wolf. A few episodes of this show had formerly aired in India on Hungama TV dubbed in Hindi as Kya Bakra Hai ("What a Goat").

Awards

2019, August 21: Pleasant Goat and Big Big Wolf: The Annual Top Ten Animation intellectual Property of Commercial Value
2018, July 4: Pleasant Goat Fun Class: Finding Treasures: NRTA 2018Q1 Excellent Chinese Television Animation
2018, April 19: Pleasant Goat Fun Class: NRTA 2017 Excellent Chinese Television Animation
2017, August 16: Pleasant Goat and Big Big Wolf: The Annual Top Ten Animation intellectual Property of Commercial Value
2017, April 15: Pleasant Goat and Big Big Wolf — Amazing Pleasant Goat: Outstanding Script Award for 2015-2016 Chinese Animated Films
2016: Pleasant Goat and Big Big Wolf: Best Animated TV Series of CCG EXPO
2013, April 24: Pleasant Goat and Big Big Wolf: Mission Incredible: Adventures on the Dragon's Trail: Animated Film Golden Cup in the 9th "Golden Monkey King" Award Competition 2013.
2013, October: Pleasant Goat and Big Big Wolf: Joys of Seasons: "Five-One Project" Award
2011: Pleasant Goat and Big Big Wolf: The Best Animation Brand Award of Chinese Culture and Art
2010: Pleasant Goat and Big Big Wolf: Golden Award (Animation) of WIPO Copyright
2010: Pleasant Goat and Big Big Wolf: The Best Chinese Animation, 16th Magnolia Award
2009: Pleasant Goat and Big Big Wolf: The Super Adventure: The 13th Huabiao Excellent Animation Award
2008, July 5: Pleasant Goat and Big Big Wolf:  Recipient of Guangdong channels' "The 2007 Grand Prize for Outstanding Domestically Produced Animated Cartoon"
2008, June 13: Pleasant Goat and Big Big Wolf:  Recipient of "14th Shanghai TV Festival Magnolia Award" – "Animation Silver Award"
2008, Jan 19: Pleasant Goat and Big Big Wolf:  Recipient of "The 4th Annual JinLong Prize for Original Cartoon Animation 2007" – "Mainland China, Hong-Kong, Macau and Taiwan The Best Creative Animation of the Year Award"
2007, Nov 5: Pleasant Goat and Big Big Wolf: Recipient of "The 2005 National Children's Programming Excellence in Merchandises and Animation Awards" – "Grand Prize for Outstanding Domestically Produced Animated Cartoon"
2007, June 15: Cartoon Express The Hong Kong Recipient of "The 2007 National Consumer's Most Popular Brand Grand Prize"
Pleasant Goat and Big Big Wolf Guangdong Privately Operated Film and Television Enterprise Award, "Outstanding Television Animated Cartoon Program Award" for 2001–2005
2005 Outstanding China Animation Award – "Pleasant Goat and Big Big Wolf (1–40 episodes)
Pleasant Goat and Big Big Wolf The show's leading character, "Pleasant Goat" was honored with Southern Children's Channel's "2005 the Most Popular Cartoon Award" and "The Annual Character Image Grand Prize"
2006, December 11: Pleasant Goat and Big Big Wolf:  Recipient of "China academy Awards" – "Technique in Animation Award"
2006, December 11: Pleasant Goat and Big Big Wolf:  Recipient of "China academy Awards" – "The Outstanding Works in Animation Award"
Certificate of "National Animation Industry Base": by Issued Guangdong Administration of Radio, Film and TV, 2006
2006, June:Pleasant Goat and Big Big Wolf: Recipient of "The 23rd Chinese Television Golden Eagle Awards" – "Nomination for Image Arts Design Award"
2006, April 24: The Guangdong Province Bureau for Broadcast Award for Creativity for Television Movie, The Professional Association 2001–2005, consists of Guangdong privately operated film and television enterprises awarded "The Animated Television Cartoon Production Award" for Guangdong Province film and television programs 2001–2005

See also
 Black Cat Detective
 Boonie Bears, a children's 3D animated series in China

References

External links
CPE(Creative Power Entertaining) Official Website 
CPE(Creative Power Entertaining) Official Website 

 
2005 Chinese television series debuts
2000s animated television series
2010s Chinese television series
2010s animated television series
Chinese children's animated comedy television series
Anime-influenced Western animated television series
Television series about sheep
Television series about wolves
Cartoon Network original programming
Fictional rivalries
China Central Television original programming
Television shows adapted into films
Mandarin-language television shows